Meg Ryan (born Margaret Mary Emily Anne Hyra; November 19, 1961) is an American actress. She began her acting career in 1981 when she made her acting debut in the drama film Rich and Famous. She later joined the cast of the CBS soap opera As the World Turns in 1982. Subsequently, she began to appear in supporting roles in films during the mid-1980s like box office hit Top Gun, achieving recognition in independent films such as Promised Land (1987) before her performance in the Rob Reiner-directed romantic comedy When Harry Met Sally... (1989) brought her widespread attention and her first Golden Globe nomination.

Ryan subsequently established herself, both nationally and internationally, as one of the most successful actresses in the 1990s and early 2000s, particularly in romantic comedy films such as When Harry Met Sally (1989), Joe Versus the Volcano (1990), Sleepless in Seattle (1993), French Kiss (1995), You've Got Mail (1998), and Kate & Leopold (2001). Her other films include The Doors (1991), Anastasia (1997), When a Man Loves a Woman (1994), Courage Under Fire (1996), Addicted to Love (1997), City of Angels (1998), Proof of Life (2000), and The Women (2008). In 2015, she made her directorial debut with Ithaca, in which she also starred.

Some film critics and media outlets have said that Ryan is one of the best actors not to have received an Academy Award nomination.

Early life 
Ryan was born and raised in Fairfield, Connecticut, to Susan Jordan (née Duggan), a former actress and English teacher, and Harry Hyra, a math teacher. Her father is of Polish descent. She was raised Catholic and attended St. Pius X Elementary School in Fairfield. She has two sisters, Dana and Annie, and a brother, musician Andrew Hyra, a member of the band Billy Pilgrim. Her parents divorced in 1976 when she was 15.

Ryan graduated from Bethel High School in 1979. She studied journalism as an undergraduate, first at the University of Connecticut and then at New York University. During college, she acted in television commercials and the soap opera As the World Turns to earn extra money. Her success as an actress led her to leave college a semester before she planned to graduate. When she joined the Screen Actors Guild, she used the surname "Ryan", her grandmother's maiden name.

Career

Early work 
After her film debut in director George Cukor's final film, Rich and Famous in 1981, Ryan played Betsy Stewart in the daytime drama As the World Turns from 1982 to 1984; her character was featured in a popular romantic story arc.
She also appeared in some television commercials during the early 1980s for Burger King and Aim toothpaste, among others. Several television and smaller film roles followed, including appearances in Charles in Charge, Armed and Dangerous, Amityville 3-D. Her role in Promised Land (1987) earned Ryan her first Independent Spirit Award nomination.

In 1986, she played Carole Bradshaw, the wife of Anthony Edwards' character, naval flight officer Nick "Goose" Bradshaw, in Top Gun. Scenes with them were reprised in the 2022 sequel Top Gun: Maverick as flashbacks, to illustrate the emotional conflicts between lead character Pete "Maverick" Mitchell (Tom Cruise) and the Bradshaws' grown son, Bradley "Rooster" Bradshaw (Miles Teller).

Ryan appeared in the film Innerspace in 1987 with her future husband Dennis Quaid, and they subsequently costarred in the remake of D.O.A. (1988) and Flesh and Bone (1993). She also costarred in 1988 with Sean Connery and Mark Harmon in The Presidio.

1989–1999: Career breakthrough 
Ryan's first leading role was the romantic comedy film When Harry Met Sally... (1989), which paired her with comic actor Billy Crystal and earned her a Golden Globe nomination. Her portrayal of Sally Albright includes an oft-recounted scene in which her character, lunching with Crystal's character in Katz's Delicatessen in Manhattan, theatrically demonstrates for him how easy it is for a woman to fake an orgasm.

Ryan next appeared in Oliver Stone's moderately successful film The Doors, and in Prelude to a Kiss, which flopped. In 1993, the hugely successful romantic comedy Sleepless in Seattle paired Ryan for a second time with Tom Hanks. They had previously been the romantic leads, with Ryan playing three different women, in John Patrick Shanley's Joe Versus the Volcano in 1990 — a commercial disappointment which later developed a cult following. (Hanks and Ryan were once again paired in another box office success, You've Got Mail, in 1998.) She was offered the role of FBI agent Clarice Starling, the protagonist of The Silence of the Lambs (1991), but rejected it due to the film's gruesome and violent themes.

In 1994, Ryan played an alcoholic high-school guidance counselor – far from the romantic-comedy ingenue roles for which she had become famous – in Luis Mandoki's romantic social drama When a Man Loves a Woman, also starring Andy Garcia. The film and her performance were both well-received by critics. A critic for Variety called the film "a first-class production, accentuated by fine performances and an unflinching script," and another praised Ryan for her "roller-coaster role." The film was a notable success, grossing $50 million in the United States alone, and garnered Ryan her first Screen Actors Guild Award nomination. The same year, Ryan returned to type, starring alongside Tim Robbins in Fred Schepisi's romantic comedy I.Q. The film centers on a mechanic and a Princeton doctoral candidate who fall in love, with the aid of the graduate student's uncle, Albert Einstein (played by Walter Matthau). Ryan later won Harvard's Hasty Pudding Woman of the Year award, and People Magazine dubbed her one of "the 50 most beautiful people in the world."

In 1995, critic Richard Corliss called Ryan "the current soul of romantic comedy." That year she also starred opposite Kevin Kline in Lawrence Kasdan's French Kiss, a comedy catering to her "America's Sweetheart" image; and was awarded the Women in Film Crystal Award – given to "outstanding women who, through their endurance and the excellence of their work, have helped to expand the role of women within the entertainment industry."

In 1996, Ryan starred as a helicopter pilot in the war drama Courage Under Fire, a critical and commercial success. The following year, she voiced the lead role in the animated film Anastasia, which met with good reviews and box office success; and she and Matthew Broderick played a pair of jilted lovers bent on revenge in the black comedy Addicted to Love, giving Ryan a female lead at least superficially different from her usual roles.
In 1998, she starred in two films. City of Angels (an American remake of Wim Wenders' Wings of Desire) drew positive reviews and earned nearly $200 million worldwide. You've Got Mail, reteaming Ryan with Hanks, earned her a third Golden Globe nomination and made more than $250 million worldwide. She also appeared in 1998's Hurlyburly with Sean Penn.

2000–2006: Continued roles 
Ryan's first film of the 2000s was Hanging Up, a Diane Keaton-directed family comedy-drama about a trio of sisters who bond over the approaching death of their curmudgeonly father. Also starring Keaton, Lisa Kudrow and Walter Matthau, the film adaptation of Delia Ephron's 1995 novel received poor reviews from critics.

The same year, Ryan was cast in the action thriller Proof of Life with Russell Crowe, directed by Taylor Hackford. In the film, she portrayed the distraught wife of a kidnapped engineer, played by David Morse, while relying on a resourceful troubleshooter who makes a profession of dealing with international bandits. While the film became a lukewarm critical and commercial success, grossing $63 million worldwide, it garnered much reportage in the tabloid press in association with Ryan and Crowe's affair. Stephen Holden, film critic for The New York Times, did not think the film worked well and opined that the actors did not connect.

A year later, she once again returned to her romantic comedy roots with Kate & Leopold (2001), alongside Hugh Jackman. A film about a British Duke who travels through time from New York in 1876 to the present and falls in love with a successful market researcher in the modern New York, the James Mangold-directed film received a mixed-to-positive response, with Lael Loewenstein of Variety summing it as "a mostly charming and diverting tale". At a total gross of $70 million, it would be Ryan's highest-grossing film of the decade.

In 2003, Ryan broke away from her usual roles, starring alongside Mark Ruffalo and Jennifer Jason Leigh in Jane Campion's erotic thriller film In the Cut. Co-producer Nicole Kidman had originally been cast in the lead, but the actress eventually dropped out after five years of development, leaving the role to Ryan, who appeared nude in a lengthy and rather graphic love scene for the first time in her career. Although her image-conflicting depiction earned Ryan and the film much media attention, the film failed with critics and grossed only $23 million in theaters.

She continued the strategy of acting against type with a leading role in Charles S. Dutton's directorial debut Against the Ropes (2004), a fictionalized sport drama about American boxing manager Jackie Kallen, the first woman to become a success in the sport. The film grossed less than $6 million in the U.S. and was panned by critics, in part because of its resemblance to other boxing films, such as the Rocky series.

2007–2009: Independent films 
Following a three-year hiatus, Ryan returned to film with Jon Kasdan's 2007 independent film In the Land of Women. Starring alongside Kristen Stewart and Olympia Dukakis, she played Sarah Hardwicke, a mother and wife facing breast cancer, who connects with her neighbor's much younger grandson, played by Adam Brody. Released to mixed reviews by critics, the film grossed $17.5 million worldwide, exceeding its budget of $10 million. Ryan received a positive response for her performance, with Kenneth Turan of the Los Angeles Times noting it "the best work [she] has done in forever".

Ryan's first film release of 2008 was The Deal, a satirical comedy film based on Peter Lefcourt's 1991 novel of the same title about Hollywood. Directed by Steven Schachter and co-starring William H. Macy, the film was shot in Cape Town and other South African locations and celebrated its world premiere at the 2008 Sundance Film Festival. Garnering generally mixed to negative reviews, it failed to draw interest among film studios, resulting in a straight-to-DVD release in January 2009. In his review for Variety, Peter Debruge said, "The characters seem to be doing all the laughing, while the general public has nothing to cling to but the horndog flirtation between mismatched leads William H. Macy and Meg Ryan—hardly ideal ingredients for mainstream success." Ryan also starred in George Gallo's My Mom's New Boyfriend, shot in 2006 but released direct-to-DVD in 2008. Co-starring Colin Hanks, Selma Blair and Antonio Banderas, the action comedy received overwhelmingly negative reviews, with David Nusair of Reel Film noting it "an unmitigated disaster virtually from its opening frames".

Ryan's last film of 2008 was The Women, a remake of the 1939 production. The all-female cast comprises Annette Bening, Debra Messing, and Jada Pinkett Smith. Written, produced and directed by Diane English, the film centers on a group of four female Manhattan socialites whose primary interest is idle gossip, with Ryan portraying a wealthy woman whose husband is cheating on her with a shop girl, played by Eva Mendes. Ryan was the first actress to join the long-delayed production, which had struggled to find financing since the early 1990s, resulting in an independent production budgeted at $18 million. Upon its release, The Women received a disastrous response from critics, with Richard Schickel of Time calling it "one of the worst movies I've ever seen". The film was a financial success, however, becoming Ryan's most successful film since 2001's Kate & Leopold with a worldwide gross of $50 million.

In 2009, Ryan starred alongside Kristen Bell and Justin Long in the independent comedy film Serious Moonlight. In this film, directed by actress Cheryl Hines and based on a screenplay by late writer Adrienne Shelly, who was murdered a year prior to filming, Ryan portrayed a high-powered female attorney who learns that her husband, played by Timothy Hutton, is about to leave their troubled marriage, and decides to hold him captive by duct-taping him to a toilet. Picked up by Magnolia Pictures, the production received a limited release throughout North America only and grossed less than $150,000 worldwide. Critical reaction to the film was generally mixed-to-negative, although Ryan was praised for her "terrific" performance. Also in 2009, Ryan guest-starred on the seventh season of Curb Your Enthusiasm.

2010–present: Directing 
Ryan was attached to several productions in the early 2010s—including the ensemble drama Lives of The Saints opposite Kat Dennings, Kevin Zegers, and John Lithgow, and Long Time Gone, a film adaptation of the April Stevens novel Angel Angel,—all of which failed to materialize. In April 2011, it was announced that Ryan would make her feature film directing debut in Into the Beautiful, described as "a contemporary Big Chill with longtime friends reconnecting", but it was never made.

In October 2012, Ryan was featured in the PBS documentary Half the Sky: Turning Oppression into Opportunity for Women Worldwide. The series introduces women and girls living under difficult circumstances and fighting to challenge them. The same month, Ryan's audiobook recording of William Saroyan's The Human Comedy was released. In October 2013, it was reported that Ryan would be returning to television to produce and star in a new comedy for NBC revolving around a former hotshot New York editor, for which it again failed to get production approval.

Following another four-year hiatus, Ryan re-teamed with Lisa Kudrow on her improvisational comedy series Web Therapy, for which she filmed five episodes in 2013. The following year, she provided the future voice of Greta Gerwig's character in the pilot of How I Met Your Dad, a woman-centric variation of the CBS sitcom How I Met Your Mother that was not picked up. CBS later passed on the project.

Ryan's next feature film was the ABC Family film Fan Girl, an independent comedy about a 15-year-old girl, played by Kiernan Shipka, with a passion for filmmaking who sets out to make a movie about her favorite band, All Time Low. It premiered at the Los Angeles Film Festival in June 2015.

Also in 2015, Ryan made her directing debut with Ithaca, a drama film based on the 1943 novel The Human Comedy by William Saroyan. Filmed in Petersburg, Virginia, it starred Ryan and had its world premiere at the Middleburg Film Festival in October.

Personal life 
Ryan married actor Dennis Quaid on February 14, 1991. They have one child together, Jack Quaid, born April 24, 1992. She and Quaid announced their separation in June 2000, and their divorce became final in July 2001.

In 2000, Ryan became romantically involved with actor Russell Crowe while working on their film Proof of Life.

In January 2006, Ryan adopted a 14-month-old girl from China whom she named Daisy True. From 2010 to 2014, Ryan was in a relationship with American singer-songwriter John Mellencamp. They reunited in 2017, and Ryan announced their engagement on November 8, 2018. In October 2019, it was reported that Ryan had ended their engagement.

Politics
Ryan has publicly supported the Democratic Party, especially its environmental protection programs and initiatives. In 2003, she supported Wesley Clark's campaign for U.S. president. She later supported John Kerry in the 2004 presidential election campaign.

Filmography

Awards and nominations 
Ryan has received multiple awards and nominations throughout her career including three Golden Globe award nominations for Best Lead Actress in a Motion Picture – Comedy or Musical for her performance in such romantic comedies as When Harry Met Sally... (1989), Sleepless in Seattle (1993) and You've Got Mail (1998).

Honors 

 1989: Honored as the Female Discovery of the Year with Pauline Collins by the Golden Apple Awards.
 1994: Recognized as the Woman of the Year during the Hasty Pudding Theatricals.
 1995: Honored with the Crystal Award during the Women in Film Crystal + Lucy Awards.
 1999: Honored with Anjelica Huston, Susan Sarandon & Amy Pascal during the Elle Women in Hollywood Awards with the Icon Award presented to her by Elle magazine.
 1999: Recognized as the Actress of the Year by the ShoWest Convention.
 2006: Nominated – EDA Special Mention Award for Actress Most In Need of a New Agent by the Alliance of Women Film Journalists.
 2008: Received the Francois Truffaut Award during the Giffoni Film Festival.
 2015: Honored with the Lifetime Achievement Award during the Savannah Film Festival.
 2018: Received the Leopard Club Award during the Locarno International Film Festival.

Accolades

References

External links 

 Meg Ryan at Biography
 
 

1961 births
20th-century American actresses
21st-century American actresses
American people of Polish descent
Actors from Fairfield, Connecticut
Actresses from Connecticut
American film actresses
American soap opera actresses
American television actresses
American voice actresses
Connecticut Democrats
Living people
New York University alumni
University of Connecticut alumni
Bethel High School (Connecticut) alumni